Bospiek is a village in the Jalal-Abad Region of Kyrgyzstan. It is part of the Aksy District. Its population was 1,295 in 2021.

References

Populated places in Jalal-Abad Region